Johnny Loughrey (20 July 1945 – 13 April 2005) was a Northern Irish singer and songwriter born in Newtownstewart, County Tyrone. With his mix of country songs, Irish ballads and easy listening music, he achieved success in both England and Ireland. Johnny's son Shaun Loughrey is also a Country and Irish singer.

Discography

Albums
Loughrey recorded several albums :
The Black Sheep (1990)
Old Photographs (1991)
Broken Engagement (1993)
Through The Years (1994)
Do You Know (1996)
The Cold Hard Truth (1998)
Run For The Border (1998)
Walking In The Sunshine (2001)
Wine & Roses (2003)
All Together Now (2005)
Compilation album:
The World of Johnny Loughrey (1997)

Videos/DVDs
The World of Johnny Loughrey (1997)

References

1945 births
2005 deaths
People from Newtownstewart
Country singers from Northern Ireland
20th-century male singers from Northern Ireland
Folk singers from Northern Ireland
Musicians from County Tyrone